Zhang Ke (born 1970) is a Chinese architect. Zhang Ke is a graduate of Tsinghua University in Beijing and the Harvard Graduate School of Design at Harvard University in Cambridge, Massachusetts, USA. In 2001, he founded his studio  (标准营造).

Zhang Ke is a recipient of the 2016 Aga Khan Award for Architecture and the 2017 Alvar Aalto Medal. In 2016, he represented China at the Venice Biennale of Architecture.

Selected works
Micro Yuan'er Children's Library and Art Centre, 2012-14
Novartis Campus Building, 2016, in Shanghai in China
Transformation of Beijings old hutongs
Museum for China Academy of Art (CAA) in Hangzhou.
Longji Primary School in Guangxi, a donation from Zhang Ke's firm to an underdeveloped rural community, which will be crowd-funded.

References

External links
ZAO/standardarchitecture

20th-century Chinese architects
21st-century Chinese architects
1970 births
Living people
Harvard Graduate School of Design alumni
Tsinghua University alumni